"Leap Up and Down (Wave Your Knickers in the Air)" is a song and single by British band, St Cecelia. Written by Keith Hancock and produced by Jonathan King, it was first released in the UK in 1971.

Background and chart success
The song was the only chart success by Corby band St Cecelia. It reached number 12 in the UK Singles Chart in 1971 and was in the chart for 17 weeks. It is one of several novelty or Bubble gum songs from the 1970s with which producer King was involved.

References 

1971 songs
1971 singles
Polydor Records singles
Novelty songs
Songs about dancing
Song recordings produced by Jonathan King